Robert Anthony Altemeyer (born 6 June 1940) is a retired Professor of Psychology at the University of Manitoba. Altemeyer also produced the right-wing authoritarianism scale, or RWA Scale, as well as the related left-wing authoritarianism scale, or LWA Scale.

He first defined the right-wing authoritarian personality in 1981, as a refinement of the authoritarian personality theory originally pioneered by University of California, Berkeley researchers Theodor W. Adorno, Else Frenkel-Brunswik, Daniel Levinson, and Nevitt Sanford. Altemeyer defined the right-wing authoritarian personality as someone who: 

 is naturally submissive to authority figures that they consider to be legitimate,
 acts aggressively in the name of said authority figures, and/or
 is very conventional (i.e. conformist) in thought and behavior.

He performed extensive research on authoritarianism, identifying the psychological makeup of authoritarian followers, and authoritarian leaders. His studies concentrated on who the followers are, how they got that way, how they think, and why they tend to be submissive and aggressive. He also collected data on authoritarianism among North American politicians.

He documented his research in several books, most recently written for general audiences in The Authoritarians at the suggestion of John W. Dean. Altemeyer's work is referenced in Dean's 2006 book, Conservatives Without Conscience. Altemeyer's latest book, Authoritarian Nightmare, co-written by Dean, is a book about U.S. President Donald Trump and his authoritarian followers.

Awards 
Altemeyer was awarded the American Association for the Advancement of Science Prize for Behavioral Science Research in 1986.

Personal life 
His son, Rob Altemeyer, was an NDP MLA in the Manitoba Legislature from 2003 to 2019.

Books 

 
 
  and several subsequent postscripts: Comment on the 2008 election, Comment on the Tea Party movement and a short comment on Donald Trump.

References

External links 

 The Authoritarians by Bob Altemeyer
 The Authoritarian Specter - Book Review, April 7, 2010

Canadian psychologists
Canadian agnostics
Academic staff of the University of Manitoba
Carnegie Mellon University alumni
1940 births
Living people